Arctia weigerti is a moth of the family Erebidae. It was described by Josef J. de Freina and Thomas Joseph Witt in 1985. It is found in northern Pakistan (Karakorum).

This species, along with the others of the genus Oroncus, was moved to Arctia as a result of phylogenetic research published by Rönkä et al. in 2016.

References

 

Spilosomina
Moths described in 1985
Moths of Asia